Jerry O'Connell Racing is an American auto racing team owned by Jerry O'Connell. The team debuted in 1970 as a Sugaripe Prune entry in 1970 Indianapolis 500 with driver Bill Vukovich, Jr. The team competed in the USAC & CART ranks until the team shut down after the seventh race of 1981 CART season - Tony Bettenhausen 200 at Milwaukee Mile.

IndyCar wins

References

American auto racing teams
1970 establishments in the United States